The women's 100 metre butterfly event at the 1980 Summer Olympics was held on 23 and 24 July at the Swimming Pool at the Olimpiysky Sports Complex.

Records
Prior to this competition, the existing world and Olympic records were as follows.

Results

Heats

Final

References

B
Women's 100 metre butterfly
1980 in women's swimming
Women's events at the 1980 Summer Olympics